The North Fork New River is a river in the U.S. state of North Carolina.  It rises in Northern Watauga County, and flows northeast to Ashe County where it joins with the South Fork New River to form the New River.

See also
New River
South Fork New River

References

Tributaries of the New River (Kanawha River tributary)
Rivers of North Carolina
Rivers of Watauga County, North Carolina
Rivers of Ashe County, North Carolina
Rivers of Alleghany County, North Carolina